The 2018–19 Egyptian Basketball Super League was the 45th season of the Egyptian Basketball Super League. It started on 29 October 2018 with the first round of the regular season and ended on 4 May 2019 with the finals. The champions qualified for the 2020 Basketball Africa League (BAL). 

Sporting was the defending champion, but was defeated in the quarterfinals by the eventual champions Zamalek, who won their 14th title after defeating Gezira in the finals, the title was decided in Game 5, which Zamalek won 87–66.

Teams
The 2018–19 season consisted of these 16 teams:

Arenas and locations

Regular season

Top Group

Bottom Group

Playoffs
The playoffs started on 27 March 2019.

Bracket

2019 Final
2019 Egyptian Basketball Super League Finals It is a final between the two Egyptian basketball giants Zamalek and Gezira. 
For Details 2019 Egyptian Basketball Super League Finals

References

Basketball competitions in Egypt
Egypt